Abderrazak Belagrouz is an Algerian academic writer who was born on 1981. He published more than 10 books and academic research. In 2019, Belagrouz won the young author award of Sheikh Zayed Book Award for his book "The Essence of Values and the Freedom of Social Concepts".

Education and career 
Abderrazak Belagrouz is an Algeria scholar and writer who was born on 7 July 1981. Belagrouz holds a PhD in the Science and Philosophy of Values and Knowledge. In 2005 till 2012, he worked as a high school teacher in Setif Province, Algeria. Since 2012, he has been working as a lecturer in the Department of Philosophy at the University of Setif-2. He founded the Algerian Society for Philosophical Studies on 25 June 2012. He had published more than ten books including "Transformations of Modern Philosophical Thinking: Questions on Concept, Meaning and Connection" and "The Crisis of Modernity and the Stakes in the Islamic Discourse". Most of his published works are about philosophy, moral values, Islamic philosophical thinking, and the problems of modernity religion. Belagrouz has also published some academic articles in Islamia Al Maa’rafa including “Moral Values and the Social Sciences: Towards the Epistemology of Governing Values”, and “High Modernity and Manifestations of the Separation of Contemporary Media from Value” . In 2019, Belagrouz won the young author award of Sheikh Zayed Book Award for his book “The Essence of Values and the Freedom of Social Concepts".

Works 

 Transformations of Modern Philosophical Thinking: Questions on Concept, Meaning and Connection, 2009.
 Neitzsche and the Mission of Philosophy, 2010
 The Philosophical Question and Paths of Openness: Interpretations of Arab Thinking of Modernity and Post Modernity 2010
 The Crisis of Modernity and the Stakes in the Islam Discourse, 2013
 Knowledge and Suspicion: the Skeptical Questioning of the Value of Knowledge for Nietzsche and its Extensions in Contemporary Philosophical Thinking, 2013
 The Power of Holiness, 2014
 Introduction to General Philosophy, 205
 Conceptual Approaches to Philosophical and Intellectual Investigations, 2015
 Transformations of Modern Philosophical Thinking: Questions on Concept, Meaning and Connection, 2017
 The Philosophy of Religion; Concepts, Problems and Directions, 2018
 Aspects of Taha Abdel-Rahman's Jurisprudence: Modernity, Globalization, Rationality and Cultural Renewal, 2018
 Horizons of Openness to the Taha Abdul Rahman Project, 2019
 Reflections on Important Intellectual Matters, 2019
 The Question of the Approach in Social Sciences, 2019

Academic Articles 

 “Moral Values and the Social Sciences: Towards the Epistemology of Governing Values”, 2015
 “High Modernity and Manifestations of the Separation of Contemporary Media from Value”, 2015

Awards 

 2019: His book “Transformations of Modern Philosophical Thinking: Questions on Concept, Meaning and Connection” won the young author award of Sheikh Zayed Book Award.

See also 

 Hussein Al Mutawaa 
 Abdallah Al Busais
 Mohamed Ait Mihoub

References 

1981 births
Living people
Algerian scholars
21st-century Algerian writers